CDE may refer to:

Education
 California Department of Education
 Career Development Event, a type of contest sponsored by the National FFA Organization
 Center for Data Engineering, IIIT Hyderabad
 Center for Distance Education at University of Alaska Fairbanks
 Certified diabetes educator
 Colorado Department of Education

Technology and computing
 Cardholder Data Environment, part of the Payment Card Industry Data Security Standard for credit card handling
 Chrome Dev Editor, a Dart programming language development environment for Google Chrome
 Collaborative Development Environment, a software development methodology
 Common Data Environment, a digital resource used in building information modeling
 Common Desktop Environment, a graphical desktop environment for Unix and OpenVMS

Other
 Carbon dioxide equivalent, a scale of measurement of the "greenhouse effect" of other atmospheric gases
 Cde., an abbreviation of comrade
 CDE, NYSE stock symbol for Coeur Mining
 Ciudad del Este, a city in Paraguay
 Comissões Democráticas Eleitorais, part of the former Portuguese Democratic Movement
 Comitetul Democrat Evreiesc, or Jewish Democratic Committee
 Commandement de l'Espace, the French military space command
 Concept development and experimentation, a technique for developing new ideas for military capabilities 
 Chengde Puning Airport, IATA code CDE